John Blakiston-Houston DL JP (11 September 1829 – 27 February 1920) was an Irish Member of Parliament.

Blakiston-Houston was the son of Richard Bayly Blakiston-Houston (d. 1857), of Orangefield, County Down, and his wife Mary Isabella Houston.  He was a grandson of Sir Matthew Blakiston, 2nd Baronet. He married Marian Gertrude Streatfield, of Sussex (d. 1890); the couple had twelve children.

John Blakiston-Houston was High Sheriff (1860) and Deputy Lieutenant (D.L.) of County Down. He also held the office of Vice-Lord-Lieutenant of County Down. Between 1898 and 1900 he was the Irish Unionist Member of parliament for North Down at Westminster.

References

External links
 

1829 births
1920 deaths
Deputy Lieutenants of Down
High Sheriffs of Down
Irish Unionist Party MPs
Irish justices of the peace
Members of the Parliament of the United Kingdom for County Down constituencies (1801–1922)
UK MPs 1895–1900